Augusto César Ferreira Gil was a Portuguese lawyer and poet.

He was born on 31 July 1873 in Porto, and died on 26 November 1929 in Guarda.
Gil's literary works combined Symbolist verse with satire and simple lyricism, though his focus on nature and poverty as subjects also made him a precursor of Portuguese Neo-Realism.

He wrote Balada da Neve, a well-known poem among Portuguese poets.

Gil has a section of the Museu de Garda dedicated to his life and works, in his home city of Guarda.

Published Poetry Collections

1894 Musa Cérula
1898 Versos
1909 Luar de Janeiro
1909 Balada da Neve
1910 O Canto da Cigarra
1915 Sombra de Fumo
1920 O Craveiro da Janela
1927 Avena Rústica
1930 Rosas desta Manhã

References

External links
 
 
 

1873 births
1929 deaths
19th-century Portuguese poets
20th-century Portuguese poets
Portuguese male poets
20th-century Portuguese lawyers
People from Porto
People from Guarda, Portugal
19th-century male writers
20th-century male writers